Duffy's Rocks is a young adult novel by the American writer Edward Fenton (1917–1995) set in Pittsburgh, Pennsylvania, during the Great Depression.

It tells the story of fourteen-year-old Timothy Francis Brennan as he comes of age in the fictional mill town of Duffy's Rocks, adjacent to Pittsburgh, and a parallel of McKees Rocks, Pennsylvania. Brennan lives with his grandmother, a feisty Irish immigrant, as he searches for his missing father.

References

1974 American novels
American young adult novels
Novels set in Pennsylvania
Great Depression novels